Hyattsville Crossing station is a Washington Metro station in Hyattsville, Maryland, on the Green Line and Yellow Line. It opened on December 11, 1993 as Prince George's Plaza, referencing the nearby Prince George's Plaza, now known as The Mall at Prince Georges. The station has a unique layout in that it is an open-cut side platformed station with a parking garage directly over the tracks.

History
The station is located in a commercial area of Hyattsville near The Mall at Prince Georges, which, prior to receiving its second name in November 2004, was called Prince George's Plaza, at East-West Highway (Maryland Route 410) and Belcrest Road. Service began on December 11, 1993.

Eventually, this segment of the Green Line was connected with the rest of the Green Line in September 1999.

However, on June 25, 2017, this service was discontinued because of budget cuts.

In May 2018, Metro announced an extensive renovation of platforms at twenty stations across the system. The platforms at the Greenbelt station would be rebuilt starting on May 29, 2021, through September 6, 2021.

In November 2020, WMATA approved a request from Prince George's County to change the name of the former Prince George's Plaza station to Hyattsville Crossing. The new name took effect on September 11, 2022.

References

External links
 

Stations on the Green Line (Washington Metro)
Hyattsville, Maryland
Stations on the Yellow Line (Washington Metro)
Washington Metro stations in Maryland
Railway stations in Prince George's County, Maryland
Railway stations in the United States opened in 1993
1993 establishments in Maryland